"Fix This Now" was the headline on the front page of Indiana's dominant newspaper, the Indianapolis Star, on March 31, 2015. Almost the entire front page of the newspaper was taken by the headline, set in large white letters on a black background.

It is unusual for a 20th- or 21st-century mass-market American newspaper to dedicate its entire front page to an editorial or for a non-tabloid to set any headline in such large type. Many publications commented on the headline on the day of its appearance. The Washington Post called the move "extraordinary", the New York Daily News called it "rare". Other major publications such as Time also took immediate notice of the Star's editorial, and news of and commentary on the event was quickly and widely tweeted and circulated on social media.

The editorial was occasioned by Indiana's newly passed Religious Freedom Restoration Act (RFRA). Unlike many State Religious Freedom Restoration Acts, Indiana's did not (at that time) prohibit its use to discriminate against LGBT people, and allowed private entities to cite the law as a defense in a civil suit. The editorial called on the legislature and Indiana governor Mike Pence to pass another law ensuring that the law cannot be used as an excuse to discriminate against gay people:

The editorial, which also promoted the hashtag #WeAreIndiana with the assertion that "Indiana embraces everyone and we do not discriminate", was published in the context of a larger general backlash against the Indiana law.

External links
Full text of editorial

References

2015 in Indiana
2015 in LGBT history
March 2015 events in the United States
Anti-homophobia
Headlines
The Indianapolis Star
LGBT in Indiana